Nelson D. Cole (1833–1899), was a United States army officer, businessman, and politician from Rhinebeck, New York.

Early life 
Cole was born on November 18, 1833, in Rhinebeck, New York. He was raised and educated in Rhinebeck and then worked at a lumberyard in New York City. 

Cole also supervised the building of a sugarcane mill in Cuba.

In 1854, he moved to St. Louis, Missouri, and lived there working in a lumberyard.

Civil War 
At the beginning of the American Civil War, Cole volunteered for the Union Army. He became the captain of Company A, 5th Missouri Volunteer Infantry (3 months, 1861). While in this organization, he was severely wounded at the Battle of Wilson's Creek on August 10, 1861. Cole then served as a captain in the 1st Missouri Volunteer Infantry Regiment (3 Years Organization).

He commanded Battery E, 1st Missouri Light Artillery at the Siege of Vicksburg.

He was promoted to major on August 12, 1863, and to lieutenant colonel on October 4, 1863. 

In 1863, Cole was promoted to Colonel of the 2nd Missouri Light Artillery Regiment.

Indian Wars 
At the end of the Civil War in 1865, Cole and eight batteries of his 2nd Missouri Artillery were sent to Omaha, Nebraska. There, he assumed command of the right, or eastern, column of the Powder River Expedition, which was to be a military expedition against the Sioux and Cheyenne Indians in the Montana and Dakota Territories.

Cole's column, which consisted mostly of cavalry and mounted artillery, started northwest on July 1, and crossed through present-day Nebraska and South Dakota, before reaching the Powder River in Montana in late August 1865. At that time, Cole's men were low on supplies, and on September 1 they began skirmishing with Indian warriors who attacked the column.

In early September, Cole began a withdrawal toward Fort Laramie, and was forced to abandon his wagons after hundreds of the columns' horses died, fighting the Powder River Battles along the way. The other columns encountered similar results, and the Powder River Expedition was deemed a failure.

On November 18, 1865 (his 32nd birthday), Cole was mustered out of the Union Army.

Later life 
Cole moved back to St. Louis and continued in the lumber business, eventually owning a planing mill.

In 1868, with his business partner, Stephen Glass, Cole opened the Cole and Glass Manufacturing Company.

Cole served on the St. Louis Board of Aldermen for six years, and was also a commissioner for the city's Lafayette Park.

Spanish–American War service 
In May 1898, after the outbreak of the Spanish–American War, Cole was commissioned a brigadier general in the United States Army by President William McKinley, and he applied for active service in Cuba or the Philippines. He was instead assigned to command the 3rd Brigade, 2nd Division, Second Army Corps. The brigade was composed of four volunteer infantry regiments, the 1st Rhode Island Volunteer Infantry, 1st Delaware Volunteer Infantry, 2nd Tennessee Volunteer Infantry, and the 3rd Missouri Volunteer Infantry; it saw no action in the war. During the winter of 1898–99, while in command of his brigade at Columbia, South Carolina, Cole developed a serious cold. He was mustered out of the service of the United States for the last time in March 1899.

Death 
Cole died from complications of his illness on July 31, 1899, in St. Louis. He is buried in the Bellefontain Cemetery, in north St. Louis.

References 

1833 births
1899 deaths
19th-century American businesspeople
19th-century American politicians
American company founders 
American expatriates in Cuba 
American military personnel of the Spanish–American War
Burials at Bellefontaine Cemetery
 Businesspeople from New York City
 Businesspeople from St. Louis
Members of the St. Louis Board of Aldermen
Military personnel from New York City
Military personnel from St. Louis
People of Missouri in the American Civil War
People of New York (state) in the American Civil War
People from Rhinebeck, New York
Politicians from New York City
Union Army officers
United States Army generals
United States Army personnel of the Indian Wars